Barbarroja is a village located in the municipality of Orihuela, in Alicante province, Valencian Community, Spain. As of 2020, it has a population of 93.

Geography 
Barbarroja is located 63km west-southwest of Alicante.

References

Populated places in the Province of Alicante